Glucuronolactone is a naturally occurring substance that is an important structural component of nearly all connective tissues.  It is sometimes used in energy drinks.  Unfounded claims that glucuronolactone can be used to reduce "brain fog" are based on research conducted on energy drinks that contain other active ingredients that have been shown to improve cognitive function, such as caffeine. Glucuronolactone is also found in many plant gums.

Physical and chemical properties 
Glucuronolactone is a white solid odorless compound, soluble in hot and cold water. Its melting point ranges from 176 to 178 °C. The compound can exist in a monocyclic aldehyde form or in a bicyclic hemiacetal (lactol) form.

History 
It is unknown if Glucuronolactone is safe for human consumption due to a lack of proper human or animal trials. However, it likely has limited effects on the human body. Furthermore research on isolated supplements of glucuronolactone is limited, no warnings appear on the Food and Drug Administration website regarding its potential to cause brain tumors or other maladies.

Uses 
Glucuronolactone is an ingredient used in some energy drinks Although levels of glucuronolactone in energy drinks can far exceed those found in the rest of the diet. Research into Glucuronolactone is too limited to assert claims about its safety  The European Food Safety Authority (EFSA) has concluded that it is unlikely that glucurono-γ-lactone would have any interaction with caffeine, taurine, alcohol or the effects of exercise. The Panel also concluded, based on the data available, that additive interactions between taurine and caffeine on diuretic effects are unlikely.

According to The Merck Index, glucuronolactone is used as a detoxicant.  

Glucuronolactone is also metabolized to glucaric acid, xylitol, and L-xylulose, and humans may also be able to use glucuronolactone as a precursor for ascorbic acid synthesis.

See also 
 Glucuronic acid
 Glucono delta-lactone
 International Programme on Chemical Safety

References 

Monosaccharides
Gamma-lactones
Tetrahydrofurans